Ulises Valentin (born 6 June 1968) is a Dominican Republic wrestler. He competed at the 1992 Summer Olympics and the 1996 Summer Olympics.

References

1968 births
Living people
Dominican Republic male sport wrestlers
Olympic wrestlers of the Dominican Republic
Wrestlers at the 1992 Summer Olympics
Wrestlers at the 1996 Summer Olympics
Place of birth missing (living people)